The Sefinafurgga (Swiss German, Germanized: Sefinenfurgge)  is a mountain pass of the Bernese Alps.

The track forms part of the Alpine Pass Route, a long-distance hiking trail across Switzerland between Sargans and Montreux.

See also
List of mountain passes in Switzerland

References

External links

Sefinenfurgge Pass on Via Alpina web site
Sefinenfurgge on Hikr web site

Mountain passes of the Alps
Mountain passes of Switzerland
Mountain passes of the canton of Bern